First English Lutheran Church is a historic church in Mansfield, Ohio. The cornerstone of the church was laid in September 1891 and the building itself was dedicated for use in 1894. The building was added to the National Register of Historic Places in 1983.

References

Lutheran churches in Ohio
Churches on the National Register of Historic Places in Ohio
Romanesque Revival church buildings in Ohio
Churches completed in 1891
Churches in Richland County, Ohio
National Register of Historic Places in Richland County, Ohio
English-American culture in Ohio
Churches in Mansfield, Ohio